Fannegusha Creek may refer to:

Fannegusha Creek (Pearl River tributary), a stream in Mississippi
Fannegusha Creek (Tchula Lake tributary), a stream in Mississippi
Fannegusha Creek (Blissdale Swamp tributary), a stream in Mississippi